Hechtia mexicana is a species of plant in the genus Hechtia. This species is endemic to Mexico.

References

mexicana
Endemic flora of Mexico
Flora of Central Mexico